This is a list of administrators and governors of Bayelsa State, Nigeria. Bayelsa State was formed in 1996 from part of Rivers State.

See also
States of Nigeria
List of state governors of Nigeria

References

Bayelsa